FFU refer to:
 Fan filter unit
 Femur fibula ulna syndrome
 Final Fantasy: Unlimited, an anime television series
 Football Federation of Ukraine
 Fred Flintstone Units, a pejorative term used to refer to United States customary units
 Futaleufú Airfield, in Chile
 Le Conquet radio or FFU (French ), a French radio station
 Focus forming units, used to express Fluorescent Focus Assay in Virus quantification